The 78th Academy Awards presented by the Academy of Motion Picture Arts and Sciences (AMPAS), took place on March 5, 2006, at the Kodak Theatre in Hollywood, Los Angeles beginning at 5:00 p.m. PST / 8:00 p.m. EST. The ceremony was scheduled one week later than usual to avoid a clash with the 2006 Winter Olympics. During the ceremony, AMPAS presented Academy Awards (commonly referred to as Oscars) in 24 categories honoring films released in 2005. The ceremony, televised in the United States by ABC, was produced by Gil Cates and directed by Louis J. Horvitz. Actor Jon Stewart hosted the show for the first time. Two weeks earlier in a ceremony at The Beverly Hilton in Beverly Hills, California held on February 18, the Academy Awards for Technical Achievement were presented by host Rachel McAdams.

Crash won three awards, including Best Picture. Other winners included Brokeback Mountain, King Kong, and Memoirs of a Geisha with three awards and Capote, The Chronicles of Narnia: The Lion, the Witch and the Wardrobe, The Constant Gardener, Hustle & Flow, March of the Penguins, The Moon and the Son: An Imagined Conversation, A Note of Triumph: The Golden Age of Norman Corwin, Six Shooter, Syriana, Tsotsi, Walk the Line, and Wallace & Gromit: The Curse of the Were-Rabbit with one. The telecast garnered nearly 39 million viewers in the United States.

Winners and nominees
The nominees for the 78th Academy Awards were announced on January 31, 2006, at the Samuel Goldwyn Theater in the Academy's Beverly Hills headquarters by Sid Ganis, president of the Academy, and actress Mira Sorvino. Brokeback Mountain earned the most nominations with eight total; Crash, Good Night, and Good Luck, and Memoirs of a Geisha tied for second with six nominations each. All five Best Picture nominees received corresponding Best Director nominations (the fourth occurrence in Oscar history since the Best Picture nominees roster was limited to five films).

The winners were announced during the awards ceremony on March 5, 2006. Several notable achievements by multiple individuals and films occurred during the ceremony. Crash was the first Best Picture winner since 1976's Rocky to win only three Oscars. Best Director winner Ang Lee became the first non-Caucasian winner of that category. For this first time since the 34th ceremony held in 1962, all four acting winners were first-time nominees. At age 20, Keira Knightley was the second-youngest Best Actress nominee for her performance as Elizabeth Bennet in Pride & Prejudice. Best Supporting Actor winner George Clooney was the fifth person to receive acting, directing, and screenwriting nominations in the same year and the first person to achieve this feat for two different films. By virtue of his nominations for both Memoirs of a Geisha and Munich, composer John Williams earned a total of 45 nominations tying him with Alfred Newman as the second most nominated individual in Oscar history. "It's Hard out Here for a Pimp" became the second rap song to win Best Original Song and the first such song to be performed at an Oscars ceremony.

Awards

Winners are listed first, highlighted in boldface, and indicated with a double dagger.

Academy Honorary Award
Robert Altman  In recognition of a career that has repeatedly reinvented the art form and inspired filmmakers and audiences alike.

Films with multiple nominations and awards

Presenters and performers
The following individuals presented awards or performed musical numbers.

Presenters

Performers

Ceremony information

Despite the negative reception from the preceding year's ceremony, the Academy rehired Gilbert Cates to oversee production of the awards gala. However, in an article published in The New York Times, it was stated that 2005 host Chris Rock would not return to host the show. According to a statement released by his publicist, "He didn't want to do it in perpetuity, He'd like to do it again down the road." Furthermore, many media outlets speculated that several AMPAS members felt uncomfortable with Rock's disparaging comments about Colin Farrell, Jude Law, and Tobey Maguire. Initially, Cates sought actor and veteran Oscar host Billy Crystal to host the ceremony again. However, Crystal declined the offer citing his commitment to his one-man comedy show 700 Sundays.

In January 2006, Cates announced that actor, comedian, and talk show host Jon Stewart, who had previously hosted two consecutive Grammy Awards ceremonies in 2001 and 2002, was chosen as host of the 2006 telecast. Cates explained the decision to hire him saying, "My wife and I watch him every night. Jon is the epitome of a perfect host — smart, engaging, irreverent and funny." In a statement, Stewart expressed that he was honored to be selected to emcee the program, jokingly adding, "Although, as an avid watcher of the Oscars, I can't help but be a little disappointed with the choice. It appears to be another sad attempt to smoke out Billy Crystal."

Several other people and companies participated in the production of the ceremony. Bill Conti served as musical supervisor for the telecast. Media firm The Ant Farm produced a thirty-second trailer promoting the broadcast featuring clips highlighting past Oscar winners to the tune of the song "Our Lives" by The Calling. Previous Oscar hosts such as Whoopi Goldberg and Steve Martin, and actors Mel Gibson, George Clooney, Halle Berry appeared in an opening comedic sketch. Actor Tom Hanks participated in a pre-taped comedic sketch lampooning Oscar speeches. Stephen Colbert (host of The Colbert Report, the sister program of Stewart's The Daily Show) narrated two different mock attack ads lampooning both the intense campaigning and lobbying during Oscar season put forth by film studios and political advertising during elections. Violinist Itzhak Perlman performed excerpts from the five nominees for Best Original Score.

Box office performance of nominated films
When the nominations were announced on January 31, the field of major nominees favored independent, low-budget films over blockbusters. The combined gross of the five Best Picture nominees when the Oscars were announced was $186 million with an average gross of $37.3 million per film. Crash was the highest earner among the Best Picture nominees with $53.4 million in domestic box office receipts. The film was followed by Brokeback Mountain ($51.7 million), Munich ($40.8 million), Good Night and Good Luck ($25.2 million), and finally Capote ($15.4 million).

Of the top 50 grossing movies of the year, 35 nominations went to 13 films on the list. Only  Walk the Line (19th), Cinderella Man (41st), Wallace and Gromit: The Curse of the Were-Rabbit (45th), and Crash (48th) were nominated for Best Picture, Best Animated Feature, or any of the directing, acting, or screenwriting. The other top 50 box office hits that earned nominations were Star Wars Episode III: Revenge of the Sith (1st), Harry Potter and the Goblet of Fire (2nd), The Chronicles of Narnia: The Lion, The Witch, and The Wardrobe (3rd), War of the Worlds (4th), King Kong (5th), Charlie and the Chocolate Factory (7th), Batman Begins (8th), March of the Penguins, (26th), and Memoirs of a Geisha (47th).

Critical reviews
Some media outlets received the broadcast positively. St. Louis Post-Dispatch television critic Gail Pennington praised Stewart's performance as host writing that he "did the Oscars proud Sunday night, turning in a four-star hosting performance that unfortunately made the rest of the show seem sluggish by comparison." Film critic Roger Ebert said that Stewart was "on target, topical and funny," and added, "He was as relaxed, amusing and at home as Johnny Carson." Columnist Ray Richmond of The Hollywood Reporter commented, "He seemed at times nervous and self-conscious, but on the whole, Stewart delivered with just the right balance of reverence and smugness."

Others media publications were more critical of the show. Television critic Rob Owen of the Pittsburgh Post-Gazette wrote that Stewart was more "amusing than funny". He added, "Many of his jokes fell flat with the stars in the Kodak Theatre, and his tendency to bow down before celebrities quickly grew tiresome." Tom Shales from The Washington Post commented, "It's hard to believe that professional entertainers could have put together a show less entertaining than this year's Oscars, hosted with a smug humorlessness by comic Jon Stewart, a sad and pale shadow of great hosts gone by." Moreover, he derided the "piles and piles and miles and miles of clips from films present and past" writing that it "squandered the visual luster" of the ceremony. Associated Press television critic Frazier Moore remarked, "Stewart, usually a very funny guy, displayed a lack of beginner's luck as first-time host...His usually impeccable blend of puckishness and self-effacement fell flat in the service of Oscar." He also criticized the decision to play music over the winner's acceptance speeches calling it "distracting and obnoxious."

Ratings and reception
The American telecast on ABC drew in an average of 38.94 million people over its length, which was an 8% decrease from the previous year's ceremony. Additionally, the show earned lower Nielsen ratings compared to the previous ceremony with 23.0% of households watching over a 35 share. Furthermore, it garnered a lower 1849 demo rating with a 13.9 rating among viewers in that demographic.

In July 2006, the ceremony presentation received nine nominations at the 58th Primetime Emmys. The following month, the ceremony won four of those nominations for Outstanding Art Direction (Roy Christopher and Jeff Richman), Outstanding Directing for a Variety, Music, or Comedy Program (Louis J. Horvitz), Outstanding Main Title Design (Renato Grgic, Alen Petkovic, Kristijan Petrovic, and Jon Teschner), and Outstanding Sound Mixing For A Variety, Music, or Animation Series or Special (Patrick Baltzell, Robert Douglass, Edward J. Greene, Jamie Santos, and Tom Vicari).

In Memoriam
The annual In Memoriam tribute was presented by actor George Clooney. The montage featured an excerpt of the theme from Now, Voyager composed by Max Steiner.

Teresa Wright - Actress
Norayuki "Pat" Morita - Actor, comedian
Robert F. Newmyer - Producer
Dan O'Herlihy - Actor
Vincent Schiavelli - Character actor
Joe Ranft - Writer, voice actor
Moira Shearer - Ballet dancer, actress
Fayard Nicholas - Choreographer, dancer
Stu Linder - Film editor
Sandra Dee - Actress
John Fiedler - Actor, voice actor
Anthony Franciosa - Actor
Joel Hirschhorn - Songwriter
Guy Green - Cinematographer, director
Barbara Bel Geddes - Actress
Robert Knudson - Sound engineer
Moustapha Akkad - Producer
Chris Penn - Actor
John Mills - Actor
Onna White - Choreographer
Debra Hill - Producer
Simone Simon - Actress
Robert Schiffer - Makeup artist
Brock Peters - Actor
Ernest Lehman - Screenwriter
Shelley Winters - Actress
Anne Bancroft - Actress
John Box - Art director
Eddie Albert - Actor
Ismail Merchant - Producer
Robert Wise - Director
Richard Pryor - Stand-up comedian, actor

See also

 12th Screen Actors Guild Awards
 26th Golden Raspberry Awards
 48th Grammy Awards
 58th Primetime Emmy Awards
 59th British Academy Film Awards
 60th Tony Awards
 63rd Golden Globe Awards
 List of submissions to the 78th Academy Awards for Best Foreign Language Film

Notes 
a: Walt Disney has the most Oscar nominations for any individual with 64.
b: Best Foreign Language Film nominee Paradise Now was initially nominated as a submission from Palestine. However, following protests from pro-Israeli groups in the United States, the Academy decided to designate it as a submission from the Palestinian Authority, a move that was decried by the film's director Hany Abu-Assad. During the awards ceremony, the film was eventually announced by presenter Will Smith as a submission from the Palestinian territories.

References

Bibliography

External links

 Academy Awards Official website
 The Academy of Motion Picture Arts and Sciences Official website
 Oscar's Channel at YouTube (run by the Academy of Motion Picture Arts and Sciences)

News resources
 Oscars 2006 BBC News
 Academy Awards coverage CNN
 Oscars 2006 - The Academy Awards The New York Times

Analysis
 2005 Academy Awards Winners and History Filmsite
 Academy Awards, USA: 2006 Internet Movie Database

Other resources
 

Academy Awards ceremonies
2005 film awards
2006 in Los Angeles
2006 in American cinema
2006 awards in the United States
March 2006 events in the United States
Television shows directed by Louis J. Horvitz